High Table Ltd v Horst [1997] EWCA Civ 2000 is a UK labour law case, concerning redundancy in English Law in the Court of Appeal (England and Wales), the highest court within the Senior Courts of England and Wales, and second only to the Supreme Court of the United Kingdom.

Facts
Mrs Christine Horst and two other employees claimed unfair dismissal after being told they were redundant, and failing applications for other positions with High Table Ltd. High Table Ltd. argued they were redundant because their workplace, which was factually always from 10am to 4pm at City firm Hill Samuel, no longer needed their ‘silver service’ waitressing after the supply contract was renegotiated the previous year. She argued that because the staff handbook contained a flexibility clause that said she could be transferred ‘within reasonable daily travelling distance’ where possible so she could not be counted as redundant.

The Tribunal held that she was redundant, and the employers had not acted unfairly. She appealed, arguing that there had been no reduction in the requirement for employees, because the mobility clause entailed her working anywhere in the City. Therefore her employer had made no redundancies available.

Judgment
Peter Gibson LJ held that she was redundant because for the purpose of redundancy her place of work was Hill Samuel, not the City as a whole. He quoted Bass Leisure Ltd v Thomas for the proposition that under ERA 1996 section 139 the place of work ‘is to be established by factual enquiry, taking into account the employee’s fixed or changing place or places of work and any contractual terms which go to evidence or define the place of employment and its extent, but not those (if any) which make provision for the employee to be transferred to another.’

Notes

United Kingdom labour case law
Court of Appeal (England and Wales) cases
1998 in case law
1998 in British law